Lamar Walker (born 26 September 2000) is a Jamaican professional footballer who plays for Miami FC and the Jamaica national team.

Early life and education
Walker played his schoolboy football at Clarendon College in Jamaica.

Career

Club
Walker played for Portmore United F.C. in Jamaica 

On 29 January 2021, Walker signed with Miami FC of the USL Championship.

International
He debuted internationally in his national youth team with the Jamaica U22 team for the 2019 Pan-American Games in Peru.

On 12 October 2019, he made his senior debut with 2–0 victory against Aruba in the CONCACAF Nations League.

On 15 October 2019, Walker scored his first goal for Jamaica against Aruba and won 2 consecutive games with a 0–6 victory in the CONCACAF Nations League.

Career statistics

Club

Notes

International goals
Scores and results list Jamaica's goal tally first.

Honors
Jamaica National Premier League: 1
2018–19

CFU Club Championship: 1 2019 CFU Club Champion

References

1999 births
Living people
Jamaican footballers
Jamaica international footballers
People from Spanish Town
Association football midfielders
USL Championship players
Portmore United F.C. players
Miami FC players
Jamaican expatriate footballers
Jamaican expatriate sportspeople in the United States
Expatriate soccer players in the United States
2021 CONCACAF Gold Cup players